Data center infrastructure efficiency (DCIE), is a performance improvement metric used to calculate the energy efficiency of a data center. DCIE is the percentage value derived, by dividing information technology equipment power by total facility power.

See also
 Power usage effectiveness
 Performance per watt
 Green computing
 Data center infrastructure management
 IT energy management

References

Benchmarks (computing)
Energy conservation
Electric power